This list of radio stations in Venezuela can be sorted by their name, modulation, frequencies, city, or website.

See also
List of Venezuelan television channels

External links
 hjlradio.webs.com

Venezuela
Radio stations

es:Anexo:Emisoras Radiales en Venezuela